Nebo is an unincorporated community in Smyth County, Virginia, United States.

References

Unincorporated communities in Smyth County, Virginia
Unincorporated communities in Virginia